Tamarine Tanasugarn was the defending champion, but she lost against Anastasia Rodionova in the first round.First-seeded Justine Henin won the final 3–6, 6–3, 6–4 against Andrea Petkovic.

Seeds

Draw

Finals

Top half

Bottom half

References

Main draw

Rosmalen Grass Court Championships
UNICEF Open - Women's Singles